Gallatin Peak is a summit located in the Madison Range in the U.S. state of Montana. The summit is located in Lee Metcalf Wilderness within Gallatin and Beaverhead-Deerlodge National Forests.

See also
 Mountains in Madison County, Montana

References

Mountains of Madison County, Montana
Mountains of Montana